RXBAR is a protein bar produced by Chicago Bar Co., which is owned by Kellogg's. It is made with egg whites, dried fruit, nuts, and dates.

History
Peter Rahal made the first RXBAR in 2013 in his parents' Glen Ellyn basement with co-founder Jared Smith. As of 2017, Chicago Bar Co. employed 75 people. In October 2017, the company was acquired by Kellogg's for $600 million. In March 2018, the company launched a line of nut butters that contain egg whites for added protein.

On January 15, 2019, RXBAR announced a voluntary recall of certain varieties of product due to possible undeclared peanut-content.

References

Energy food products
American snack foods
Kellogg's brands
2017 mergers and acquisitions